Phloroglucinol carboxylic acid is a trihydroxybenzoic acid, a type of phenolic acid. 

It is produced by Pseudomonas fluorescens. It is a catechin degradation product excreted by the bacterium Acinetobacter calcoaceticus, a species of bacteria part of the human body normal flora, grown on catechin as sole source of carbon. It is also found in wine.

References 

Trihydroxybenzoic acids
Phloroglucinols